Elisabet Martínez (born 13 June 1988) is a Spanish rugby sevens player. She is a member of Spain's women's national rugby sevens team to the 2016 Summer Olympics. She captained her squad at the last Olympic qualification tournament for Rio 2016 when they defeated Russia 19-12 in the finals.

References

External links 
 

1988 births
Living people
Spain international women's rugby union players
Spain international women's rugby sevens players
Olympic rugby sevens players of Spain
Rugby sevens players at the 2016 Summer Olympics
People from Osona
Sportspeople from the Province of Barcelona
Rugby union players from Catalonia